Patrick "Patsy" Dorgan (22 March 1936 – 27 December 2021) was an Irish footballer who played for several clubs in both the League of Ireland and the English League, most notably, Blackburn Rovers, Cork Hibernians and Cork Celtic.

Career
Born in Cork, Dorgan first came to prominence on the Glasheen team who beat Home Farm in the FAI Youth Cup. Blackburn Rovers manager Jackie Carey was impressed with the young Dorgan and within weeks he was signed to the English club. After three years at Blackburn and shortly after the start of the 1957–58 season he signed for League of Ireland debutants Cork Hibernians. In 1966 Dorgan moved to Cork Celtic when their centre half John Coughlan retired. His tenure here was brief, however, he continued to play with the Aer Lingus team in the Cork Shipping League, until the mid-1980s.

Honours
Glasheen
FAI Youth Cup: 1953–54

References

1936 births
2021 deaths
Association football central defenders
Association footballers from Cork (city)
English Football League players
League of Ireland players
Blackburn Rovers F.C. players
Cork Hibernians F.C. players
Cork Celtic F.C. players
Republic of Ireland expatriate association footballers
Expatriate footballers in England
Association football players not categorized by nationality